George Lewis (9 August 1897 – 1988) was a Welsh rugby union and professional rugby league footballer who played in the 1920s and 1930s.

Playing career

International honours
George Lewis won 3 caps for Wales (RL) in 1926–1928 while at St Helens.

County honours
George Lewis played right-, i.e. number 3, and scored a try and a goal in Monmouthshire's 14-18 defeat by Glamorgan in the non-County Championship match during the 1926–27 season at Taff Vale Park, Pontypridd on Saturday 30 April 1927.

Championship final appearances
George Lewis played , and scored 3-goals in St. Helens' 9-5 victory over Huddersfield in the Championship Final during the 1931–32 season at Belle Vue, Wakefield on Saturday 7 May 1932.

Challenge Cup Final appearances
George Lewis played right-, i.e. number 3, and was captain in St. Helens' 3–10 defeat by Widnes in the 1929–30 Challenge Cup Final at Wembley Stadium, London on Saturday 3 May 1930, in front of a crowd of 36,544.

County Cup Final appearances
George Lewis played left-, i.e. number 4, and scored 2-goals in St. Helens' 10-2 victory over St Helens Recs in the 1926 Lancashire County Cup Final during the 1926–27 season at Wilderspool Stadium, Warrington on Saturday 20 November 1926, and played right-, i.e. number 3, and scored 3-goals in the 9-10 defeat by Warrington in the 1932 Lancashire County Cup Final during the 1932–33 season at Central Park, Wigan on Saturday 19 November 1932.

Club records
George Lewis is second in the St Helens all time goal-scoring list behind Kel Coslett, and fourth on the points-scoring list behind Kel Coslett, Paul Loughlin and Austin Rhodes.

Genealogical information
George Lewis was the brother of the rugby union footballer for Pontypool RFC, and the rugby league  for St. Helens; Stanley "Stan" Lewis.

References

External links
Profile at saints.org.uk

1897 births
1988 deaths
Footballers who switched code
Monmouthshire rugby league team players
Pontypool RFC players
Rugby league fullbacks
Rugby league centres
Rugby league five-eighths
Rugby league halfbacks
Rugby league players from Pontypool
Rugby union centres
Rugby union players from Pontypool
St Helens R.F.C. captains
St Helens R.F.C. players
Wales national rugby league team players
Welsh rugby league players
Welsh rugby union players